This is a complete filmography of Bette Davis. Davis began acting in films in 1931, initially as a contract player with Universal Studios, where she made her film debut in Bad Sister. She was initially seen as unappealing by studio executives, and was assigned to a string of B-movies early in her career.

Davis made a transition to Warner Bros. in 1932, and made her breakthrough performance in The Man Who Played God, opposite George Arliss. She continued in a succession of films, but did not gain further recognition until she agreed to star in John Cromwell's adaptation of the W. Somerset Maugham's Of Human Bondage on a loan-out to RKO. The role of Mildred Rogers had been rejected by several actresses, but Davis achieved critical acclaim for her performance. Dangerous (1935) became the first time she won an Academy Award for Best Actress.

In 1936, convinced her career would be ruined by appearing in mediocre films, Davis walked out on her Warner Brothers contract, and decided to make films in England. Davis explained her viewpoint to a journalist, saying: "I knew that, if I continued to appear in any more mediocre pictures, I would have no career left worth fighting for." She eventually settled her disagreements with Warner Brothers, and returned to the studio in 1937. In 1938, Warner Brothers cast her in Jezebel. It was a critical and box office success, and earned her another Best Actress Academy Award.

Davis was at the peak of her career in the late 1930s and early-to-mid 1940s, at a time when she was one of the highest-paid actresses in Hollywood and turned down parts she found inferior. She received an Academy Award nomination for her performance in Dark Victory, and earned acclaim for her performances in The Old Maid and The Letter. Davis also earned acclaim for her portrayal of Elizabeth I of England in The Private Lives of Elizabeth and Essex, with Errol Flynn and Olivia de Havilland. Davis later appeared in the melodrama The Little Foxes, and in the comedy film The Man Who Came to Dinner.

One of Davis' biggest successes at Warner Bros. was Now, Voyager, which earned her another Academy Award nomination. Her later films for the studio, including Winter Meeting and Beyond the Forest, failed at the box office. As her popularity waned, Warner Brothers dropped her contract in 1949, and from thereafter on, she occupied a freelance career.

Davis received a career revival in All About Eve for 20th Century-Fox. She played an aging Broadway star, Margo Channing, who is manipulated by an obsessed fan. The film was one of the biggest hits of 1950, and she was again nominated for an Academy Award, but lost to Judy Holliday. Although Davis earned strong reviews for her performance in The Star, her career waned throughout the remainder of the decade.

In the 1960s, Davis received yet another revival in popularity. Although her appearance in Pocketful of Miracles was negatively received, she earned praise for her portrayal of the faded child star, Jane Hudson, in What Ever Happened to Baby Jane?, which garnered her a final nomination for an Academy Award. She retained a cult status throughout the remainder of her career, and appeared in several other thriller films, such as Hush...Hush, Sweet Charlotte and The Nanny.

Davis starred in her final film Wicked Stepmother, although she felt about the poor script. The film had production problems, with Davis often quarreling with Larry Cohen, and she withdrew from the film shortly after production began. After fifty-eight years of acting, she made her final appearance.

Film

1930s

1940s

1950s

1960s

1970s

1980s

Short films appearing as herself

Box Office Ranking 

 1939 - 6th (US)
 1940 - 9th (US)
 1941 - 8th (US)
 1942 - 15th (US), 7th (UK)
 1943 - 13th (US), 8th (UK)
 1944 - 10th (US), 5th (UK)
 1945 - 14th (US), 2nd (UK)
 1946 - 15th (US), 5th (UK)
 1947 - 5th (UK)
 1951 - 7th (UK)

Lux Radio Theatre appearances 

–Command Performance - 1942 - Clark Gable, Bette Davis, Count Basie

Stage

Television

1950s

1960s

1970s

1980s

Special appearances

Awards and nominations

Competitive awards

Honorary awards

Bibliography 
 
 
 
 
 
 Bette Davis official website
 Jerry Haendiges Vintage Radio Logs: Lux Radio Theater

References

Actress filmographies
Bette Davis
American filmographies